The Paschall House is a historic house at North Oak and East Center Streets in Searcy, Arkansas.  It is a two-story wood frame I-house, with an integral T ell to the rear, finished in brick veneer and capped by a gabled roof.  A full-height porch extends across the front, its flat roof supported by round wooden columns.  A wrought iron balcony projects over the center entrance beneath the porch.  The house was built about 1890, and is a rare surviving example of the I-house form in White County from that period.

The house was listed on the National Register of Historic Places in 1991.

See also
National Register of Historic Places listings in White County, Arkansas

References

Houses on the National Register of Historic Places in Arkansas
Houses completed in 1890
Houses in Searcy, Arkansas
National Register of Historic Places in Searcy, Arkansas
1890 establishments in Arkansas
I-houses in Arkansas